Frank Josef Kriz (March 26, 1894 – January 11, 1955) was an American gymnast and Olympic champion. A member of the New York Sokol and the Bohemian Gymnastic Association, he competed in the 1920, 1924, and 1928 Summer Olympics. In 1924, he received a gold medal in vault. In 1922 and 1924, he won the Amateur Athletic Union national gymnastics title. In 1959, he was one of the initial inductees to the USA Gymnastics Hall of Fame.

Kriz was the very first U.S. gymnast, male or female, to win a medal of any sort at a Summer Olympic Games or World Championships on foreign soil, and would remain the only one to win any medal at those such games on foreign soil for nearly half a century until Cathy Rigby won a silver on balance beam at the 1970 World Championships in Ljubljana and Peter Kormann won a bronze medal on floor exercise at the 1976 Montreal Summer Olympic Games.

References

External links

1894 births
1955 deaths
American male artistic gymnasts
Gymnasts at the 1920 Summer Olympics
Gymnasts at the 1924 Summer Olympics
Gymnasts at the 1928 Summer Olympics
Olympic gold medalists for the United States in gymnastics
Medalists at the 1924 Summer Olympics
20th-century American people